Manisha Vakil is an Indian politician from Bharatiya Janata Party, representing Vadodara City constituency at Gujarat Legislative Assembly since the 2017 state legislature elections. She was elected from the same constituency in the 2012 elections, as well.

References 

Gujarat MLAs 2012–2017
Gujarat MLAs 2017–2022
Year of birth missing (living people)
Living people
Bharatiya Janata Party politicians from Gujarat
Women in Gujarat politics
21st-century Indian women politicians